The Riverlife project aims to engage the community to actively appreciate Cooks River in Sydney, Australia.  It usually more a tidal inlet then a River although is capable of flooding and receives the stormwater from 100 square kilometers of a highly urbanised part of the Sydney Metropolitan area.  Other major waterways of Sydney include the Hawkesbury, Sydney Harbour, Georges River, and Port Hacking, all of which are Rias, but Cooks River shows more signs of slow weathering and development as a river than of being a flooded river valley.   The River was an important part of the life of local aborigines for tens of thousands of years, and was a  beautiful recreation facility for Sydney Siders during the early years of the development of the City.  While severely damaged by development, the River and its catchment has many redeeming features, and the history of repair is now almost as rich as the history of damaging industrial and urban use.

Riverlife is a joint initiative of Marrickville, Canterbury and Strathfield Councils funded by Our Environment - It's a Living Thing .  Riverlife is one of a number of projects / groups / initiatives which are attempting to lead to improvements to Cooks River.  One other significant project is CookNet 

The Riverlife project began in 2002 and has involved a number of aspects.

Riverlife Interpretive Tours
Riverlife Interpretive Tours are an opportunity for local citizens to share knowledge and passions about the Cooks River in an interactive and engaging way. The first group of Riverlife Interpretive Tour Guides were trained in October 2003 and resulted in highly popular kayaking tours on the river run by the Tempe River Canoe Club; an arts workshop that allows creative expression of the value of the river; and a walking tour that interprets the history and stories of the Cooks River.

Sustainable Water Planning
Through the Urban Stormwater Integrated Management (USWIM) project Marrickville Council is working with the community to manage our water sustainably. Through water sensitive urban design the objective is to:

Reduce pollution of the Cooks River 
Provide an alternative  water source for irrigation through rainwater harvesting  
Secure our future water needs through wise planning and appropriate development

Stream Watch
Streamwatch is a program where school and community groups test the health of their local waterways for variables such as temperature, pH, conductivity and turbidity. RiverLife is working to increase the number of schools and community groups within the Cooks River Catchment participating in the Streamwatch program. Streamwatch is important for the community as:
 
it is a reliable indicator of the health of the catchment's waterways
information from streamwatch is a valuable source of scientific knowledge 
Streamwatch participants gain a practical education on natural waterways
it provides an engaging connection to our natural environment.

Riverlife Cooks River Film Festival
The RiverLife Cooks River Film Festival called for local film makers to make a short film on the Cooks River. Filmmakers were encouraged to produce unique interpretations of the river from either the past, present or future. The films had to reflect positive behavioural changes that would encourage positive impacts on the river. Prizes were awarded at a Gala screening and awards night at the Newtown Dendy.

Riverbank Restoration Works
The RiverLife project is funding major structural and revegetation works to reduce erosion and improve water quality.  An example of this is along a section of the Cooks River through Strathfield Golf Course where significant bank slumping and sedimentation has been occurring.

References

Environment of New South Wales
Organisations based in New South Wales
Nature conservation organisations based in Australia
Cooks River